Owen Hughes-Holland is a composer, musician and producer from Buckinghamshire, United Kingdom. He is the founder of Alaskan Productions, progressive post-hardcore band First Signs of Frost, and alt pop project Polar Caps. He has worked alongside and toured with Enter Shikari, Deaf Havana, You Me At Six, Example, DJ Fresh and AlunaGeorge. He composed music for the DVD trailer score for Vin Diesel's Pitch Black (film)

In an interview published 6 August 2017 with Wonderbox Metal Hughes-Holland speaks of "drawing influences from everything really, anything from Deftones, Tool & Sikth, through to Tears For Fears, Soundgarden & Dave Matthews Band".

Discography
 In Our Final Chapter EP (2004) with First Signs of Frost
 The Lost Cause EP (2007) with First Signs of Frost
 Atlantic (2009) Zestone Records with First Signs of Frost
 Solutions EP (2011) Alaskan Records with Polar Caps
 Altitudes EP (2014) Alaskan Records with Polar Caps
 The Shape Of Things To Come EP (2017) Basick Records with First Signs of Frost

References

English composers
English record producers
Musicians from Buckinghamshire
Living people
Year of birth missing (living people)